Megan Mansell (née Annear; born 24 July 1990) is a New Zealand broadcaster. She is a co-host on The Edge Breakfast with Nickson, Meg & Eli.

Early life 
Mansell was born on 24 July 1990 in Lower Hutt. She studied at the New Zealand Broadcasting School at Ara Institute of Canterbury, in Christchurch, New Zealand.

Career 
Mansell started her radio career co-hosting the breakfast show on Classic Hits in Queenstown. In 2013, she began hosting The Edge Workdays of Awesome on radio station The Edge. In late 2017, she became a co-host of The Edge Breakfast with Dom, Meg & Randell, with Dom Harvey and Clint Randell. In the 2020 New Zealand Radio Awards her team of breakfast hosts were finalists for Best Breakfast Show – Music Network. Harvey left the show in July 2021, leading to a change in the show to The Edge Breakfast with Meg & Randell. The show changed to The Edge Breakfast with Nickson, Meg & Eli in 2022.

In 2016, she launched a YouTube channel focusing on fashion and beauty, and in 2019 she received the Supreme Award for Influencer of the Year from fashion magazine Miss FQ.

Personal life 
In 2018, she became engaged to co-worker Guy Mansell, and they married on 21 March 2020. They have a daughter, Daisy Penelope Mansell, born on 24 October 2021.

References

Living people
New Zealand broadcasters
1990 births
People from Lower Hutt